The 1965 Cal Poly Mustangs football team represented California Polytechnic State College—now known as California Polytechnic State University, San Luis Obispo—as a member of the California Collegiate Athletic Association (CCAA) during the 1965 NCAA College Division football season. Led by fourth-year head coach Sheldon Harden, Cal Poly compiled an overall record of 2–8 with a mark of 1–4 in conference play, placing fifth in the CCAA. The Mustangs played home games at Mustang Stadium in San Luis Obispo, California.

Schedule

References

Cal Poly
Cal Poly Mustangs football seasons
Cal Poly Mustangs football